Denial Ahmetović (born 26 February 1995) is a Bosnian pop singer. He was the winner of the fifth season of the televised singing contest Zvijezda možeš biti ti (You Can Be a Star) on Hayat TV.

Early life
Denial Ahmetović was born in Zenica, Bosnia and Herzegovina, during the Bosnian War. His first name is a version of "Daniel". His father is Vehid Ahmetović and his mother's name is Adisa. Ahmetović has a sister named Aldijana. The Ahmetović family later relocated to Kakanj.

Zvijezda možeš biti ti 5 and Cijeli moj svijet
In 2012 Ahmetović auditioned for the fifth season of the televised Bosnian singing contest Zvijezda možeš biti ti on Hayat TV. He became the winner on 12 April 2013.

Only one week after winning the contest, Ahmetović released his first single, "Nema ljubavi dok je Bosna ne rodi", on 19 April 2013. It was written by Marina Tucaković and Miligram musician Aleksandar Milić. His second song, "Cijeli moj svijet", written by Eldin Huseinbegović, was premiered 19 July 2013. His debut studio album Cijeli moj svijet was released on 23 May 2014.

Personal life
Ahmetović was involved in a minor car crash on 31 December 2014 on the road to a New Year's Eve concert in Maglaj.

Discography
Cijeli moj svijet (2014)

References

External links
Discography at Discogs

1995 births
Living people
Musicians from Zenica
People from Kakanj
21st-century Bosnia and Herzegovina male singers
Bosniaks of Bosnia and Herzegovina
Bosnia and Herzegovina Muslims
Hayat Production artists